Le Donjon is a former canton of the Allier department, Auvergne, France. It was disbanded following the French canton reorganisation which came into effect in March 2015. It consisted of 13 communes, which joined the canton of Dompierre-sur-Besbre in 2015. It had 4,920 inhabitants (2012).

Communes
The canton consisted of the following communes:

Avrilly
Le Bouchaud
Chassenard
Le Donjon
Lenax
Loddes
Luneau
Montaiguët-en-Forez
Montcombroux-les-Mines
Neuilly-en-Donjon
Le Pin
Saint-Didier-en-Donjon
Saint-Léger-sur-Vouzance

See also
Cantons of the Allier department

References

Donjon
2015 disestablishments in France
States and territories disestablished in 2015